The End Complete is the third album by American death metal band Obituary. It was released on April 21, 1992. This album marked the return of guitarist Allen West who performed on the debut album.

This album is Obituary's best selling, with over 100,000 copies sold in the U.S. and more than 250,000 worldwide.  It reached #16 on Billboard's Top Heatseekers chart.  Also, the band's new logo introduced on The End Complete is the best selling shirt print in the history of Roadrunner Records.

A music video was made for the title track.

Track listing

Personnel
John Tardy - vocals
Allen West - lead guitar
Trevor Peres - rhythm guitar
Frank Watkins - bass
Donald Tardy - drums

Trivia

Interested in industrial music, Trevor Peres suggested the use of drum machines for the album, but the other band members did not agree. This refusal led him to form Meathook Seed.

References

External links
The End Complete at Media Club

1992 albums
Obituary (band) albums
Roadrunner Records albums
Albums produced by Scott Burns (record producer)
Albums recorded at Morrisound Recording